The 1974 Massachusetts gubernatorial election was held on November 5, 1974. Michael Dukakis was elected to a four-year term, from January 4, 1975 until January 4, 1979. He defeated incumbent Governor of Massachusetts Francis W. Sargent in the general election.

(Two Governors, Dukakis and Edward J. King, lost the Democratic nomination to each other in 1978 and 1982, respectively. In 2002, acting Governor Jane Swift ran for re-election but withdrew after polls showed her trailing Mitt Romney for the Republican nomination.)

Republican primary

Governor

Candidates
Francis Sargent, incumbent Governor
Carroll Sheehan, former State Commerce Commissioner

Results

Lieutenant Governor
Incumbent Lieutenant  Governor Donald R. Dwight was unopposed in the Republican Primary.

Democratic primary

Governor

Candidates
Michael Dukakis, former State Representative from Brookline and nominee for Lt. Governor in 1970
Robert H. Quinn, Attorney General

Results

Lieutenant Governor

Candidates
Thomas P. O'Neill III, State Representative and son of U.S. Representative Tip O'Neill
Christopher A. Iannella, Boston City Councillor
 Eva Hester, Democratic National Committeewoman
 John P. Lynch, Hampden County Register of Deeds and candidate for U.S. Senate in 1972
 Thomas Martin Sullivan, resident of Randolph

Results

General election
Dukakis defeated Sargent by 207,931 votes. It was the first gubernatorial victory for the Massachusetts Democratic Party since 1962.

Results by county

See also
 1973–1974 Massachusetts legislature

References

1974
Massachusetts
Gubernatorial
Massachusetts
Michael Dukakis